Glen Island Park is a  waterfront park, located on Glen Island, on the Long Island Sound, New York. The park is owned and operated by Westchester County and shares the island with a privately operated but county-owned entertainment facility, the Glen Island Harbour Club (formerly the Glen Island Casino) The Glen Island Casino was a springboard to success during the 1930s Big Band Era, including that of Ozzie Nelson, Charlie Barnet, Claude Thornhill, Les Brown, The Dorsey Brothers and Glenn Miller. Westchester County residency is required for parking and beach access.

History

In 1879, former U.S. Congressman John H. Starin bought Glen Island and four nearby islands. He gave Glen Island its name and converted the islands into Starin's Glen Island, a summer resort for city dwellers that has been called "the first theme park". The islands were connected by causeways and piers, and each island featured a different international theme. Steamships transported visitors from New York City to the park. The park, which opened in 1881, attracted thousands of people daily, included among its attractions a bathing beach, a natural history museum, a zoo, a German beer garden and castle, musical entertainment, and a Chinese pagoda.

In 1923, Westchester County acquired the site, which is now a public recreational park.

In 2020 Glen Island Park was temporarily closed and converted into a Coronavirus testing site. It has since been returned for use by Westchester County residents.

References

External links

 Official website

See also
New York islands

Geography of New Rochelle, New York
Islands of Westchester County, New York
Parks in Westchester County, New York
Long Island Sound
Beaches of Westchester County, New York
Islands of New York (state)
1881 establishments in New York (state)